Peter Thomas Gosar (born December 29, 1967) is an American politician. Gosar was the Democratic nominee for Governor of Wyoming in 2014 but lost to Republican Matt Mead. Gosar also served as chair of the Wyoming Democratic Party and as chair of the Wyoming Board of Education.

Early life and education 
Gosar was born in Rock Springs, Wyoming to Antone John Gosar and Bernadette M. (née Erramouspe) Gosar, the seventh of ten children, and is of Basque and Slovenian descent. He grew up in Pinedale, Wyoming and is the younger brother of Paul Gosar, a Republican U.S. Representative from Arizona.

Gosar attended the University of Wyoming from 1986 until 1990, where he played linebacker on the Wyoming Cowboys football team. He also holds an associate degree in aviation technology from San Juan College, which he obtained in 1999.

Career 
Gosar was a teacher with the Pinedale Public Schools.

Gosar first ran for governor of Wyoming in 2010, but lost the Democratic primary to Leslie Petersen. He again ran for governor in 2014, when he won the Democratic primary unopposed but lost the general election to Republican incumbent Matt Mead.

Gosar served as a member of the Wyoming Board of Education from 2011 until 2017. He was Chairman of the Board beginning in 2015. His term as chairman and his tenure on the Board of Education ended on February 18, 2017. He was succeeded as chairman by Walt Wilcox.

Gosar has also served as chairman of the Democratic Party of Wyoming.

Gosar has served as an Albany County Commissioner since 2018.  He is presently the Albany County Commission Chairman.  
Gosar is a pilot in Laramie, Wyoming.

Political positions
Gosar is often contrasted with his brother, Paul Gosar, an Arizona congressman who is a staunch conservative. While Paul supports criminalizing abortion, Pete believes it should be legal. He is a supporter of the Patient Protection and Affordable Care Act.

Peter has appeared in advertisements for Paul's Democratic opponent as well as advertisements denouncing Paul.

References

External links 
 Pete Gosar at ballotpedia.org

1967 births
Living people
American people of Basque descent
American people of Slovenian descent
Candidates in the 2010 United States elections
Candidates in the 2014 United States elections
Educators from Wyoming
People from Laramie, Wyoming
People from Rock Springs, Wyoming
People from Pinedale, Wyoming
School board members in Wyoming
State political party chairs of Wyoming
University of Wyoming alumni
Wyoming Cowboys football players
Wyoming Democrats
American football linebackers
21st-century American politicians